Nova Topola is a village in the municipality of Lebane, Serbia. According to the 2002 census, the village had a population of 121 people.

References

Populated places in Jablanica District